Prince Frederick William of Solms-Braunfels (22 October 1770 in Braunfels – 13 April 1814 in Slawentzitz) was a Prussian Major General and by birth member of the House of Solms-Braunfels.

Early life
He was the fourth son of Ferdinand William Ernest, 2nd Prince of Solms-Braunfels (1721–1783) and his wife, Countess Sophie Christine Wilhelmine of Solms-Laubach (1741–1772).

Biography
He became known mainly through his marriage to Princess Frederica of Mecklenburg-Strelitz.  She was the widow of Prince Louis Charles of Prussia (1773–1796). When she became pregnant in 1798, he married her in order to avoid a scandal.  The daughter died soon after birth.  Frederick William was alleged to have been strongly inclined to consume alcohol and had to quit military service in 1805 for health reasons. He also lost his income and even his brother advised Frederica to divorce.  She was initially against it, but when in 1813, she met Ernest Augustus, King of Hanover (1771–1851), she, too, wanted the divorce.  Before they got around to it, however, Frederick William died, in 1814 in Sławięcice.

Marriage and issue 
From his marriage to Duchess Frederica of Mecklenburg-Strelitz, the following children are known:
 Princess Sophie of Solms-Braunfels (born: 27 February 1799; died: 20 October 1799)
 Prince Frederick Wilhelm (born: 11 September 1800; died: 14 September 1800).
 Prince Frederick William Henry Casimir of Solms-Braunfels (1801–1868); married in 1831 Countess Maria Anna Kinsky von Wchinitz und Tettau (1809–1892).
 Princess Louise Auguste of Solms-Braunfels (1804–1865); married in 1827 Prince Albert of Schwarzburg-Rudolstadt (1867 Prince) (1798–1869).
 Unnamed daughter (1805–1805).
 Prince Alexander Frederick Louis of Solms-Braunfels (1807–1867); married in 1863 Baroness Louise von Landsberg-Velen (1835–1894).
 Prince Frederick William Carl of Solms-Braunfels (1812–1875); married firstly from 1834-1841 (morganatic marriage) Louise Beyrich, and secondly, in 1845, Princess Sophie von Löwenstein-Wertheim-Rosenberg (1814–1876).

Ancestry

External links
 http://www.thepeerage.com/p10584.htm#I105840

Footnotes 

1770 births
1814 deaths
People from Braunfels
People from Solms-Braunfels
House of Solms-Braunfels
German princes
Major generals of Prussia